Parthenius II (? – 16 May 1651) was Ecumenical Patriarch of Constantinople for two periods (1644–1646, 1648–1651).

Kallistos Ware relates that Parthenius, before becoming Patriarch, wrote to Pope Urban VIII in 1640: "To your Beatitude I render all due obedience and submission, acknowledging you to be the true successor of the leader of the Apostles, and the chief shepherd of the Catholic Church throughout the whole world. With all piety and obedience I bow before your holy feet and kiss them, asking your blessing, for with full power you guide and tend the whole of Christ's chosen flock. So I confess and so I believe; and I am zealous that my subjects also should be such as I am myself. Finding them eager, I guide them in the ways of piety; for there are not a few who think just as I do".

He was a partisan of Cyril Lucaris.

References

External links
 , ec-patr.org (in Greek)

Year of birth missing
1651 deaths
Bishops of Adrianople
17th-century Ecumenical Patriarchs of Constantinople